Truth in a Structured Form is the eleventh album by American Southern rock band Atlanta Rhythm Section, released in August 1989. It was the band's first album in eight years. It featured a heavy drum sound and a sharper, more synthesized gloss over the songs, a departure from their previous approach.

Track listing
All tracks are written by Buddy Buie and Ronnie Hammond, except noted.

Personnel
Atlanta Rhythm Section
 Barry Bailey - guitar
 J.E. Garnett - bass
 Dean Daughtry - keyboards
 Steve Stone - guitar
 Ronnie Hammond - lead and backing vocals
 Sean Burke - drums

Additional Musicians
 Buddy Buie - backing vocals
 Brendan O'Brien - backing vocals, guitar

Production
 Producer: Buddy Buie
 Associate producer: Bill Lowery

References

External links

1989 albums
Albums produced by Buddy Buie
Atlanta Rhythm Section albums